Nosiviwe Noluthando Mapisa-Nqakula (born 13 November 1956) is a South African politician who currently serves as the Speaker of the National Assembly as of 19 August 2021. She has previously held the office of Minister of Defence and Military Veterans from June 2012 to August 2021. She was also the Minister of Home Affairs from 2004 to 2009 and Minister of Correctional Services from 2009 to 2012.

Early life and education
Mapisa-Nqakula obtained a primary teacher's diploma from the Bensonvale Teachers College.

Career
In 1984, she left South Africa to undergo military training in Angola and the Soviet Union. During this time she served as the head of a commission that was set up by the ANC to investigate desertions of ANC Umkhonto we Sizwe (MK) members to the United Nations High Commissioner for Refugees (UNHCR) in Angola.

For several years she worked with political military structures within the ANC and was deployed to help rebuild ANC structures.

In 1993, she became the Secretary-General of the ANC Women's League. Before her appointment as Minister of Home Affairs, she held the position as Deputy-Minister of the department.

Following violent riots that occurred in Gauteng and KwaZulu-Natal in July 2021, she faced calls to resign as Defence and Military Veterans' Affairs minister due to the national defence force not being prepared for it. On 5 August 2021, president Ramaphosa reshuffled his cabinet, in which he removed Mapisa-Nqakula as Minister and replaced her with National Assembly speaker Thandi Modise. He said that Mapisa-Nqakula "will be redeployed to a new position." On 19 August 2021, Mapisa-Nqakula was elected as the Speaker of the National Assembly, effectively swapping positions with Modise.

Mapisa-Nqakula was nominated for another term on the ANC NEC ahead of the party's 55th National Conference in December 2022, however, at the conference she did not receive enough votes to be re-elected to the 80 seat structure.

Controversy
Since 2016, Mapisa-Nqakula has been involved in a number of controversies, including allegations of contravening health protocols and inappropriately using state resources.

Shortly before her election as Speaker, it was announced that she was under investigation for allegedly receiving a R5 million bribe from a defence contractor, spending R7 million on aircraft charters and luxury hotels.

On 8 September 2020 in her capacity as Minister of Defense and Military Veterans she undertook a trip to Zimbabwe to meet her counterpart in preparation for a SADC Troika meeting and the UN reconfiguration of the Force Intervention, which comprises troops from the SADC region.

Following the trip reports soon emerged that Members of the Governing Party The African National Congress accompanied Mapisa-Nqakula on a South African National Defense Force Air Force Jet after huge blacklash from opposition parties like The Democratic Alliance President Cyril Ramaphosa asked the Minister to submit a detailed report in 48 Hours.Ultimately leading to The President issuing a formal reprimand to Mapisa-Nqakula and further sanctioned the Minister by imposing a salary sacrifice on the Minister’s salary for three months, starting from 1 November 2020.

On the 9 February 2023 at the State of the Nation Address delivered by President Cyril Ramaphosa in Cape Town City Hall Mapisa-Nqakula ordered Members of Parliament from the Economic Freedom Fighters to be removed from the Chamber after they raised numerous points of order delaying the Presidents speech.According to the Leader of the Economic Freedom Fighters Julius Malema he accused Mapisa-Nqakula of misconduct as well as claiming that the Speaker referred to Members of the EFF as "animals" a claim Mapisa-Nqakula has denied.

The EFF have since announced that they have tabled a motion of no confidence against Mapisa-Nqakula.

Personal life
She is married to Charles Nqakula.

In July 2020, Mapisa-Nqakula and her husband tested positive for COVID-19. They have both recovered.

References

1956 births
African National Congress politicians
Correctional Services ministers of South Africa
Defence ministers of South Africa
Female defence ministers
Female interior ministers
Living people
Members of the National Assembly of South Africa
Ministers of Home Affairs of South Africa
Women government ministers of South Africa
Women members of the National Assembly of South Africa
Xhosa people
Women legislative speakers